The 11th Legislative Assembly of Saskatchewan was elected in the Saskatchewan general election held in June 1948. The assembly sat from February 10, 1949, to May 7, 1952. The Co-operative Commonwealth Federation (CCF) led by Tommy Douglas formed the government. The Liberal Party led by Walter Adam Tucker formed the official opposition.

Tom Johnston served as speaker for the assembly.

Members of the Assembly 
The following members were elected to the assembly in 1948:

Notes:

Party Standings 

Notes:

By-elections 
By-elections were held to replace members for various reasons:

Notes:

References 

Terms of the Saskatchewan Legislature